Primo Sentimenti (28 December 1926 – 13 October 2016), also known as Sentimenti V, was an Italian football player and coach from Bomporto in the Province of Modena, who mainly played as a midfielder or as a defender, although he was a utility player who was capable of playing anywhere along the pitch.

Career
Sentimenti played club football for several Italian sides, most prominently Lazio, with whom he played over 200 games.

Personal life

The Sentimenti family were prominent in Italian football; several of Primo's relatives in the game include brothers Ennio, Lucidio, Vittorio and Arnaldo; cousin Lino; and nephews Roberto and Andrea Sentimenti.

Primo played with two of his brothers, Vittorio and Lucidio, at Lazio during the 1950s.

References

Italian footballers
Serie A players
Serie B players
Modena F.C. players
S.S.C. Bari players
S.S. Lazio players
Udinese Calcio players
Parma Calcio 1913 players
1926 births
2016 deaths
Association football defenders 
Association football midfielders